Don Russell (1905–1972) was a British art director.

Selected filmography
 Lend Me Your Husband (1935)
 Joy Ride (1935)
 To the Public Danger (1948)
 Trouble in the Air (1948)
 A Tale of Five Cities (1951)
 Dangerous Cargo (1954)
 Port of Escape (1956)
 The Dungeon of Harrow (1962)

References

Bibliography
 Brian McFarlane. Lance Comfort. Manchester University Press, 1999.

External links

1905 births
1972 deaths
British art directors
Film people from London